Torbay is a northern suburb of Auckland, New Zealand. It is located in the upper east coast bays of the city's North Shore, and is governed by Auckland Council. The name Torbay comes from the area of the same name in the south east of Devon, England, and from the Tor, a presque-isle at the north end of Waiake Beach that becomes an island at high tide.

Attractions in the area include Long Bay Regional Park which attracts over a million visitors each year. There are also a number of smaller public beaches (Waiake, Torbay Beach, Winstone's Cove, Ladder Bay), which are highly accessible and utilised both for swimming, and mooring small yachts.

Demographics

Torbay had a population of 4,305 at the 2018 New Zealand census, an increase of 240 people (5.9%) since the 2013 census, and an increase of 363 people (9.2%) since the 2006 census. There were 1,524 households, comprising 2,112 males and 2,193 females, giving a sex ratio of 0.96 males per female. The median age was 41.9 years (compared with 37.4 years nationally), with 789 people (18.3%) aged under 15 years, 783 (18.2%) aged 15 to 29, 2,019 (46.9%) aged 30 to 64, and 714 (16.6%) aged 65 or older.

Ethnicities were 86.1% European/Pākehā, 4.9% Māori, 2.6% Pacific peoples, 11.2% Asian, and 2.2% other ethnicities. People may identify with more than one ethnicity.

The percentage of people born overseas was 43.8, compared with 27.1% nationally.

Although some people chose not to answer the census's question about religious affiliation, 53.1% had no religion, 36.7% were Christian, 0.1% had Māori religious beliefs, 0.6% were Hindu, 0.3% were Muslim, 1.1% were Buddhist and 2.1% had other religions.

Of those at least 15 years old, 1,071 (30.5%) people had a bachelor's or higher degree, and 333 (9.5%) people had no formal qualifications. The median income was $38,000, compared with $31,800 nationally. 918 people (26.1%) earned over $70,000 compared to 17.2% nationally. The employment status of those at least 15 was that 1,779 (50.6%) people were employed full-time, 606 (17.2%) were part-time, and 102 (2.9%) were unemployed.

Education
It was established in 1954. In 2019, students of Torbay School taught younger tamariki Te Reo and sign language during Te Wiki o te Reo Māori (Māori Language Week).

Notable residents 
 Willis Thomas Goodwin Airey, historian

Notes

Suburbs of Auckland
East Coast Bays
Bays of the Auckland Region
Beaches of the Auckland Region